Fulvia Miani Perotti (1844 - 1931) was an Italian writer who lived in the Apulia region of Italy.

Life 
She was the daughter of Nicola Perotti, a lawyer and member of the Parliament, and a Greek marchioness. As a liberal-spirited woman, she  wrote for a number of magazines and newspapers under the pen name Voluntas, meaning "willingness".

Throughout her life, she devoted herself to charitable endeavours, including the establishment of the first professional school for girls in southern Italy, created for the daughters of sailors in Bari. She was President of Catholic Associations, of the Daughters of Charity of Saint Vincent de Paul, as well as director of the Italian Red Cross, and during the 1915-1918 war she was President of the Civil Assistance Committee that worked to provide assistance to soldiers and their families.

In 1871, she became a friend of Giuseppe Mazzini and went to visit him in the fortress of Gaeta, where he was being held as a political prisoner. Fourteen letters document the continued interaction between Mazzini and Fulvia Miani Perotti, who had become his friend and benefactor. When Mazzini went into exile, Fulvia and her husband Gaetano Perotti (a Piedmontese officer in the army of the Kingdom of Italy)  remained faithful to Mazzini by refusing to give information to governmental agents, which resulted in the end of Perotti's army career.

Works

Legacy 

Fulvia's son, Armando Perotti, was perhaps Apulia's greatest poet. The  municipal library of Cassano delle Murge is named after him.
An old town square in Polignano a Mare, where the family's nobiliary house (and Fulvia's birthplace) stands, was renamed after her.

References

External links 
 
 

1844 births
1931 deaths
People from the Province of Bari
Italian poets
19th-century Italian women writers
20th-century Italian women writers